Leighton Vander Esch (born February 8, 1996) is an American football middle linebacker for the Dallas Cowboys of the National Football League (NFL). He played college football at Boise State, and was drafted by the Cowboys in the first round of the 2018 NFL Draft.

Early years
Vander Esch was born and raised in Riggins, Idaho. He is of Dutch descent. He attended Salmon River High School in Riggins, and competed in eight-man football, basketball, and track. His graduating class of 2014 had eleven students.

In football, Vander Esch played quarterback and middle linebacker. As a senior, he completed 121 out of 199 attempts (60.8 percent) for 2,155 yards and 28 passing touchdowns with one interception. He also had 157 carries for 1,565 yards and 34 rushing touchdowns, 131 tackles (85 solo), five interceptions, five fumble recoveries, and four defensive touchdowns. In the state's final 53-38 win against Lighthouse Christian School, he collected more than 500 yards of total offense and scored all five of his team's offensive touchdowns. He led SRHS to a 1A D2 state championship and was named All-Idaho 1A Division II Player of the Year.

In basketball, he averaged 29.4 points and 11.1 rebounds per game as a senior and led Salmon River to consecutive 1A D2 state championships.

College career
As a redshirt freshman in 2015, he appeared in all twelve games as a backup linebacker and registered 20 tackles (14 solo), one sack, one fumble recovery, and a first down on a fake punt. As a sophomore in 2016, he was limited to six games due to a neck injury, returning in the twelfth game against Air Force; he tallied 27 tackles (23 solo), 3.5 tackles-for-loss, one sack, and one interception.

As a junior in 2017, Vander Esch became a starter at weak-side linebacker and had a breakout season. He was named the Mountain West Defensive Player of the Year after making 141 tackles (fifth in the FBS), four sacks, two interceptions, and four forced fumbles (led the team). After the season, Vander Esch opted not to play as a senior (fifth-year) for the Broncos in 2018 and entered the 2018 NFL Draft. He finished his collegiate career with 188 tackles, five sacks and three interceptions.

Professional career
On December 21, 2017, Vander Esch announced his decision to forgo his remaining eligibility and enter the 2018 NFL Draft. Vander Esch attended the NFL Scouting Combine at Indianapolis in late February and completed all of the combine and positional drills. Vander Esch's overall combine performance impressed scouts as he finished tied for second among all linebackers in the vertical jump and short shuttle. He also tied for fifth among his position group in the broad jump and finished fifth among linebackers in the three-cone drill. 

Vander Esch participated at Boise State's pro day on April 3, but opted to stand on his combine numbers and only performed positional drills. He attended pre-draft visits with multiple teams, including the New England Patriots, Pittsburgh Steelers, Philadelphia Eagles, Detroit Lions, Dallas Cowboys, and Buffalo Bills. At the conclusion of the pre-draft process, Vander Esch was projected to be a first round pick by NFL draft experts and scouts. He was ranked as the third best linebacker prospect in the draft by Sports Illustrated, the third best outside linebacker by DraftScout.com, the fourth best linebacker by NFL analyst Mike Mayock, and the sixth best outside linebacker in the draft by ESPN analyst Mel Kiper Jr.

2018

The Dallas Cowboys selected Vander Esch in the first round (19th overall) of the 2018 NFL Draft, and he was the third linebacker selected. 

On May 11, the Cowboys signed Vander Esch to a fully guaranteed four-year $11.84 million that includes a signing bonus of $6.69 million.

Throughout training camp, Vander Esch competed to be the starting middle linebacker against Jaylon Smith. Head coach Jason Garrett named Vander Esch the backup middle linebacker, behind Smith, to start the regular season.

He made his professional regular season debut in the Cowboys' season-opener at the Carolina Panthers and recorded three combined tackles in their 16–8 loss. On September 30, Vander Esch earned his first career start after Sean Lee sustained a hamstring injury and was inactive for three games (Weeks 4–6). He made six combined tackles as the Cowboys defeated the Detroit Lions 26–24. The following week, he collected 14 combined tackles (11 solo) during their 19–16 loss at the Houston Texans in Week 5. On November 11, Vander Esch recorded a season-high 13 solo tackles and made his first career interception during a 27–20 win over the Philadelphia Eagles, earning him NFC Defensive Player of the Week. He intercepted a pass by Eagles' quarterback Carson Wentz, that was intended for tight end Zach Ertz, during the first quarter. The following week, Vander Esch recorded eight combined tackles, a season-high three pass deflections, and intercepted a pass by Falcons' quarterback Matt Ryan during a 22–19 win at the Atlanta Falcons in Week 11. In Week 16, he collected a season-high 15 combined tackles (11 solo) as the Cowboys defeated the Tampa Bay Buccaneers 27–20.

He finished his first season in 2018 with a franchise rookie-record 140 combined tackles (102 solo), seven deflections, and two interceptions in 16 games and 11 starts. Vander Esch finished with the third most tackles among all players in 2018, behind Indianapolis Colts' linebacker Shaquille Leonard (163 tackles) and Green Bay Packers' linebacker Blake Martinez (144 tackles). He received an overall grade of 87.5 from Pro Football Focus in 2018, which ranked fourth among all qualifying linebackers.

The Dallas Cowboys finished first in the NFC East with a 10–6 record and earned a playoff berth. On January 5, 2019, Vander Esch started in his first career playoff game and recorded ten combined tackles (six solo) as the Cowboys defeated the Seattle Seahawks 24–22 in the NFC Wildcard Game.

2019
In week 4 against the New Orleans Saints, Vander Esch recorded a team-high 11 tackles in the 12–10 loss. He missed weeks 12–16 with a nerve issue in his neck before deciding to undergo surgery to correct the issue. He was placed on injured reserve on December 24, 2019. Across nine games, Vander Esch recorded 72 tackles (43 solo, 29 assisted), 0.5 sacks, three passes defended, and one forced fumble.

2020
In the week 1 season opener against the Los Angeles Rams, Vander Esch recorded two combined tackles in the first half before leaving the game with a broken collarbone. The next day it was announced that he would undergo another surgery and was placed on injured reserve on September 15. He was designated to return from injured reserve on October 7 and began practicing with the team again. He was activated on October 19, 2020. Across 10 games, Vander Esch recorded 60 tackles (32 solo, 28 assisted), one sack, one forced fumble, and one fumble recovery.

2021
On May 3, 2021, the Cowboys declined the fifth-year option of Vander Esch's contract, which would make him a free agent in the 2022 offseason. Across 17 games, Vander Esch recorded 77 tackles (48 solo, 29 assisted), one sack, two passes defended, and one interception.

2022
On March 18, 2022, Vander Esch re-signed with the Cowboys on a one-year contract.

2023
On March 14, 2023, Vander Esch re-signed with the Dallas Cowboys on a two-year deal.

NFL career statistics

Regular season

References

External links
 
 Boise State Broncos bio
 Dallas Cowboys bio

Living people
1996 births
People from Idaho County, Idaho
Players of American football from Idaho
American football linebackers
Boise State Broncos football players
Dallas Cowboys players
American people of Dutch descent
National Conference Pro Bowl players
Ed Block Courage Award recipients